Reform Tower is an historic structure in Meethill, an area to the southwest of the Scottish town of Peterhead, Aberdeenshire. Dating to 1832, it is now a Category B listed building. In five stages, each narrowing slightly, the tower is constructed of squared granite. It was originally designed to be an observatory, but was not completed.

The tower's foundation stone was laid by George Mudie in August 1832. Its architect is not known.

Gallery

References

Sources
Neish, Old Peterhead, p. 197

Listed buildings in Peterhead
Category B listed buildings in Aberdeenshire
1832 establishments in Scotland
Towers in Scotland